Songbird is a discontinued music player originally released in early 2006 with the stated mission "to incubate Songbird, the first Web player, to catalyze and champion a diverse, open Media Web".

Songbird utilizes the cross-platform frameworks Mozilla XULRunner and GStreamer media framework. Songbird runs on Windows and macOS. In 2012, an Android version and an iOS version were released. Songbird at one point also supported Solaris and Linux, but this support was dropped. As a result, users forked Songbird and created a Windows, Mac, and Linux compatible derivative under the name Nightingale.

Songbird announced on 14 June 2013 that it would stop all operations and shut down by 28 June. The company was unable to fund further business operations and as a result, all operations and associated services were discontinued.

Features
Multi-platform compatibility with Windows XP, Vista and Mac OS X v10.5 (x86, x86-64).
Ability to play multiple audio formats, such as MP3, AAC, Ogg Vorbis, FLAC, Apple Lossless and WMA
Ability to play Apple FairPlay-encoded audio on Windows and Mac platforms via hooks into QuickTime (authorization takes place in iTunes)
Ability to play Windows Media DRM audio on Windows platforms
A skinnable interface, with skins called "feathers"
Media files stored on pages viewed in the browser show up as playable files in Songbird
MP3 file download
Ability to subscribe to MP3 blogs as playlists
Ability to build custom mixes
Ability to scan the user's computer for all audio files and add them to a local library
A configurable and collapsible graphical user interface similar to iTunes, and mini-player mode
Keyboard shortcuts and media keyboard support
Automatic updates
Last.fm integration via a plugin, complete with love/hate buttons
Insound.com and HypeMachine integration
Microsoft MTP compatible device support
Ability to edit and save metadata tags
Gapless Playback & ReplayGain
Watch Folders
Media Importing / Exportings (from and to iTunes)
Automatic Library Files Organization

Add-ons

Extensions
Users can add features and change functionality in Songbird by installing extensions. Extensions are similar to the Extensions for the Firefox browser and can be easily ported. Community coded extensions are available on Songbird's addons support page. Known community designed extensions are: Qloud Tagging & Search, eMusic Integration, iTunes Importer, Artist Tracker, Library File Organizer, Audioscrobbler Notifier, Wikipedia Artist Display, SHOUTcast Radio Directory, UnPlug, Adblock Plus, Taglib metadata handler, ChatZilla, and FoxyProxy.

Skins
Skins are referred to as "feathers" in Songbird and give users and artists the ability to change the look of Songbird via an extension which generates a default skin. Using CSS (and optionally XUL), and an image manipulation program such as Photoshop or GIMP, users are then able to make Songbird look however they want.

History
Songbird was founded by Rob Lord and developed by Pioneers of the Inevitable (with members who previously developed for both Winamp and the Yahoo! Music Engine).

In January 2010, Philips announced they would ship a personalized version of Songbird with some of their line of portable audio/video players.

On 2 April 2010, it was announced that official Linux support would end with Songbird version 1.7.2. POTI Inc. would instead focus on its Windows and Mac OS X versions of Songbird, providing only unofficial support for Linux releases.

Sometime during late 2012 or early 2013, Songbird's public SVN was taken down, along with their wiki and other source code related utilities. A survey later sent out via Twitter by Songbird suggested that POTI was closing the desktop player source code, planning to later sell an updated version, fixing many outstanding bugs and feature requests by users who had been ignored for years.

See also

List of feed aggregators
Comparison of feed aggregators
Nightingale, a community-supported fork of Songbird
Qtrax, a client based on Songbird.

References

External links

Songbird homepage(sourceforge)
Nightingale homepage - A community supported fork of the Songbird media player and library. 
Songbird homepage, at archive.org
Songbird Add-ons, at archive.org
Songbird, the "open source iTunes killer," flies today - Boing Boing interview with Rob Lord
Lord of the Birds…Songbird  - Interview with Rob Lord
Songbird ver. 1.4.2 review at Lifehacker.com -  23 December 2009, accessed 14 January 2010

2006 software
Free media players
Free web browsers
Gecko-based software
Gopher clients
IPod software
Jukebox-style media players
macOS media players
Solaris media players
Tag editors
Windows media players
Windows web browsers
Portable software
Linux media players
Software that uses GStreamer
Software that uses XUL
Discontinued web browsers